Maxwell Setton (born 24 October 1909, date of death unknown) was a British film producer, notably active in the 1950s. He was born in Cairo to British parents and studied law, becoming a barrister. 

In 1937, he became legal adviser to Mayflower Productions, the production company of Charles Laughton and Erich Pommer. After serving in the war, he became an assistant to Lord Archibald, who was managing Independent Producers Ltd.

After a few years, he set up as a producer with Aubrey Baring and they made movies for a newly organised Mayflower Productions, releasing through Rank. They produced six films together, predominantly adventure films set outside Britain written by Robert Westerby. Setton then set up his own company, Marksman Films, whose first film was Twist of Fate (1954).

In 1956 it was announced Setton would run the production company of Donna Reed and Tony Owen, Todon, to make six films, starting with The Nylon Web by Westerby. It ended up becoming Town on Trial. However no films resulted. Neither did a proposed biopic of Joseph Conrad.

He made a number of films for Mike Frankovitch's company, Frankovitch Productions, who released through Columbia Pictures. He worked with Ken Hughes and John Guillermin a number of times.

He helped establish Bryanston Films.

In 1964 he was appointed head of European production for Columbia. The following year he became a vice-president of Columbia as well. In 1969 he resigned and announced he was returning to film production with three properties for Columbia: Caravan to Vaccarès by Alistair MacLean, Those Who Walk Away by Patricia Highsmith and Rosy is My Relative by Gerald Durrell. In January 1970 he became Paramount's vice president in charge of foreign production.

Selected filmography
The Spider and the Fly (1949) - with Aubrey Baring, for Mayflower
Cairo Road (1950) - with Aubrey Baring, for Mayflower
The Adventurers (1951) aka Fortune in Diamonds, The Great Adventure - with Aubrey Baring, for Mayflower
So Little Time (1952) - with Aubrey Baring, for Mayflower
Raiders in the Sky aka Appointment in London (1953)  - with Aubrey Baring, for Mayflower
The Golden Mask aka South of Algiers (1953) - with Aubrey Baring, for Mayflower
They Who Dare (1954) - with Aubrey Baring, for Mayflower
Twist of Fate (1954) aka Beautiful Stranger - for Marksman
Footsteps in the Fog (1955) - for Frankovitch Productions and Columbia Pictures
Keep It Clean (1956) -for Marksman
Thunderstorm (1956) - for Frankovich Productions
The Man Who Never Was (1956) - for 20th Century Fox
Wicked as They Come (1956) - for Frankovitch Productions
Town on Trial (1957) - for Marksman
The Long Haul (1957) - for Marksman
Web of Evidence (1958) aka Beyond this Place
I Was Monty's Double (1958) aka Hell, Heaven or Hoboken

References

External links

Maxwell Setton at the BFI
 Maxwell Setton interview at British Entertainment History Project.

English film producers
1909 births
Year of death missing